The Lake Chala tilapia (Oreochromis hunteri) is a species of cichlid fish that is endemic to Lake Chala, a small crater lake on the border of Kenya and Rombo District of Kilimanjaro Region in Tanzania. It is considered critically endangered by the IUCN, with the two primary threats being deterioration of its habitat due to siltation, and other non-native tilapia species that have been introduced to Lake Chala. Before these introductions, the Lake Chala tilapia was the only fish in Lake Chala. It is very closely related to the similar Jipe tilapia (O. jipe), another highly threatened species from the same general region of Kenya and Tanzania.

The specific name hunteri honours the British zoologist Henry C. V. Hunter (1861-1934), who collected the type, and who provided notes on this species' distribution. O. hunteri is the type species of the genus Oreochromis.

References

Lake Chala tilapia
Freshwater fish of Kenya
Freshwater fish of Tanzania
Critically endangered fauna of Africa
Fish described in 1889
Taxa named by Albert Günther
Taxonomy articles created by Polbot